Maranatha is an Aramaic phrase in the New Testament of the Bible, translated as O Lord, come.

Maranatha may also refer to:

Entertainment
 Maranatha (band), sludge metal band from the United States
 "Maranatha" (Millennium), an episode of the television series Millennium
 Maranatha! Music, a Christian music label

Schools
 Maranatha Baptist University, in Watertown, Wisconsin, United States
 Maranatha Christian University, in Bandung, Indonesia
 Maranatha College, in Meridian, Idaho, United States
 Maranatha High School, in Pasadena, California, United States
 Maranatha Christian School, with several campuses in Victoria, Australia

Other
 Maranatha Campus Ministries, a Charismatic/Pentecostal-oriented Christian ministry
 Maranatha FC, a Togolese association football club
 Maranatha Village, a Baptist retirement community near Sebring, Florida, United States
 Maranatha Volunteers International, a Christian non-profit organization based in Sacramento, California, United States